The 2018 Ekiti State gubernatorial election occurred in Nigeria on 14 July 2018. APC Governor Kayode Fayemi who ruled from 2010 to 2014 won re-election for a second term, defeating Kolapo Olushola of the PDP.

Kayode Fayemi emerged APC gubernatorial candidate after scoring 941 votes and defeating his closest rival, Segun Oni, who received 481 votes. He picked Bisi Egbeyemi as his running mate. Kolapo Olushola was the PDP candidate with Deji Ogunsakin as his running mate. 35 candidates contested in the election.

Electoral system
The Governor of Ekiti State is elected using the plurality voting system.

Primary election

APC primary
The APC primary election was held on 12 May 2018. Kayode Fayemi won the primary election polling 941 votes against 33 other candidates. His closest rival was Segun Oni, a former governor of the state, who came second with 481 votes, Kayode Ojo came third with 281 votes.

PDP primary
The PDP primary election was held on 8 May 2018. Kolapo Olushola emerged as a consensus candidate, with Adebayo Clement Adeyeye as his running mate.

Results
A total number of 35 candidates registered with the Independent National Electoral Commission to contest in the election.

The total number of registered voters in the state was 909,585, while 405,861 voters were accredited. Total number of votes cast was 403,451, while number of valid votes was 384,594. Rejected votes were 18,857.

By local government area
Here are the results of the election by local government area for the two major parties. The total valid votes of 384,594 represents the 35 political parties that participated in the election. Blue represents LGAs won by Kayode Fayemi. Green represents LGAs won by Kolapo Olushola.

References 

Gubernatorial election 2018
Ekiti State gubernatorial election
Ekiti State gubernatorial elections